Majid Sharif (January/February 1951– November 19, 1998) was an Iranian translator and journalist who was one of the victims of the Chain murders of Iran. He was a follower of the late Islamist modernist leftist theoretician Ali Shariati. Articles by him criticizing Iranian government policies appeared in a monthly magazine, Iran-e Farda (Iran of Tomorrow), which was closed down by court order on December 5, 1998.

Education 

Sharif graduated from Sharif University of Technology in Iran and was a student in Physics Department of University of California at Los Angeles before his return to Iran.

Death 

In November 1998, Sharif left his home for a jog and never returned. On November 19, 1998 he was found on the side of a road in Tehran and identified by his mother in the coroner's office six days later on November 25, 1998. The official cause of his death was given as heart failure.

See also
 Chain murders of Iran
 Human rights in Iran

References

Iranian translators
Iranian journalists
Iranian murder victims
1998 deaths
People murdered in Iran
Burials at artist's block of Behesht-e Zahra
1950 births
Sharif University of Technology alumni
University of California, Los Angeles alumni
20th-century translators
20th-century journalists